It Is for England is a 1916 silent film propaganda war drama written and directed by Laurence Cowen. It is also called The Hidden Hand.

It is preserved at the Library of Congress.<ref>Catalog of Holdings The American Film Institute Collection and The United Artists Collection at The Library of Congress p.91  c.1978 by The American Film Institute</ref>

Cast
Helene Gingold - Reverend Christian St. George
Percy Moran - Lt. Stephen English RN
Margaret Shelley - Mary Marshalluncredited''
Thomas Canning - John Marshall MP
R. Courtland - Percy Marshall
Lionel d'Aragon - Sir Charles Rosenbaum Bart MP
Gilbert Parker - Himself (*as Sir Gilbert Parker)
Leonard Shepherd - The Kaiser
Roy Travers - The Kaiser's Foreign Secretary

References

External links
It Is for England at IMDb.com

1916 films
British propaganda films
Films set in England
British silent feature films
British black-and-white films
British war drama films
1910s war drama films
1916 drama films
1910s British films
Silent war drama films